Timo  Glock (born 18 March 1982) is a German professional racing driver, and BMW Motorsport works driver. He raced in Formula One for the Jordan, Toyota, Virgin Racing and Marussia F1 teams. He finished 10th in the Drivers' Championship in both 2008 and 2009, scoring three podium finishes.

After leaving Formula One in 2013, Glock became a works driver for BMW in the Deutsche Tourenwagen Masters, driving for BMW Team MTEK, and achieved his first DTM podium at the Red Bull Ring, and a first win at the season finale at the Hockenheimring.

Early career
Born in Lindenfels, West Germany, Glock began his motorsport career in 1998 at the age of 15. He won several karting championships as well as the BMW ADAC Formula Junior Cup in 2000 and the Formula BMW ADAC Championship in 2001. In his first German Formula Three Championship season in 2002, he finished third in the standings en route to rookie of the year honours. In 2003, he competed in the Formula Three Euroseries, winning three races and scoring three other podium finishes, which were enough to place him in fifth position in the Championship.

Formula One

Jordan (2004)
Glock was signed as Jordan Grand Prix's test driver for the 2004 Formula One season and made his Formula One debut at the Canadian Grand Prix replacing Giorgio Pantano, who had a contract dispute with Jordan. He finished 11th, but inherited 7th following the disqualification of the Williams and Toyota cars and thus scored two points on his debut.

He finished the season with Jordan, taking over from Pantano for the last three races. Glock's sponsorship with Deutsche Post helped bring back the colours of DHL to Jordan.

Champ Car

2005
In 2005, Glock shifted his career to the United States, racing in the Champ Car World Series with Paul Gentilozzi's Rocketsports team. His best finish was second place at the Circuit Gilles Villeneuve at the Molson Indy Montreal in Canada, where he was defeated by Oriol Servia. In the closing laps of the race Glock twice retained the lead over Servia by missing the track's final chicane. As the rules require drivers who gain or retain a position by driving off the racing surface to give way, Glock was asked to move over by Champ Car officials, and let Servia take the lead. Glock obliged midway through the final lap, giving him enough time to try to take the lead back, but to no avail.  Glock finished 8th in the final season points standings and won the Champ Car World Series' Rookie of the Year award.

GP2

2006–2007

In 2006, Glock raced in Europe in the GP2 Series, the level immediately below Formula One. He started with the midfield BCN Competicion team, gaining average results. In mid-season, however, he moved to the front-running iSport team and after a string of improved results finished fourth in the drivers' standings, also winning an award for "most improved driver" in the series.

Glock was also re-signed for 2007 by iSport and won one feature race and four sprint races on his way to the championship.  Following the serious crash of regular Formula One BMW driver Robert Kubica in Canada, it was speculated that Glock might take over the drive. However, the team instead chose its lead test driver Sebastian Vettel. Vettel's drive as a fill-in helped him get a full-time racing seat with the Toro Rosso team later in the season, starting at the Hungarian Grand Prix, and Glock was then promoted to the main test and reserve driver for BMW.

Return to Formula One

Toyota (2008–2009)

After winning the GP2 Series in 2007, Glock was connected to several F1 teams. He signed a contract with Toyota F1, though still under a test driver contract with BMW, which led to the dispute being brought before the Contract Recognition Board. He scored his first points of 2008 in the Canadian Grand Prix, finishing 4th ahead of Felipe Massa's Ferrari. Glock qualified a career-best fifth at the Hungarian Grand Prix, and finished the race in second place. At the Singapore Grand Prix, Glock finished 4th, one of his best of the season.

In the final race of the 2008 season, the Brazilian Grand Prix, Glock was seventh with a few laps to go when it started to rain. Glock remained on the track with dry-weather tyres, while most of the other drivers, including Lewis Hamilton, opted to pit for wet tyres. The decision to stay out moved Glock up the order, ahead of Hamilton on track. Starting the final lap, Glock was fourth but was struggling on his dry-weather tyres as the rain intensified. He was passed by Toro Rosso's Sebastian Vettel and McLaren's Lewis Hamilton in the final corners. Hamilton regained fifth place to win the 2008 Drivers' Championship. Glock finished the race in sixth and the championship in tenth position, with 25 points, behind teammate Jarno Trulli.

After being in the top 10 in all three practice sessions in Australia, Glock qualified 6th on the grid. However, the rear wing of his (and teammate Trulli's) Toyota was deemed to be too flexible and thus illegal, and his time was cleared and he started 19th. During the race, he worked his way through the pack to finish in 5th place. However, after the race, Lewis Hamilton was disqualified and stripped of his 4th-place finish, and Glock was promoted to 4th. A week later in Malaysia, he qualified 5th, but started 3rd after penalties to both Sebastian Vettel and Rubens Barrichello. At the start of the race, Glock slipped to 8th, but an inspired tyre choice as the rain started, coupled with precise driving, saw Glock finish in 3rd when the race was ended early on lap 32.

Consecutive seventh places for Glock in the rain in China, and in the dry in Bahrain had given him a total of 12 points for the season, although these finishes came in contrasting ways.  In China he qualified 14th, not making it out of Qualifying 2, whilst in Bahrain he qualified 2nd, led the race in the first stint, but he had a poor second stint on hard tyres which forced him to battle his way back to seventh by the end of the race. Glock earned his second podium of the season when he finished 2nd behind Lewis Hamilton at the Singapore Grand Prix after qualifying in 6th. The race began well when Glock passed Alonso and was given a place by Mark Webber who was forced to let Alonso overtake. Late in the race Glock seemed set for 3rd place until Nico Rosberg crossed the white line exiting the pits, earning him a drive through penalty and allowing Glock to easily take 2nd place.

In qualifying for the 2009 Japanese Grand Prix, Glock crashed heavily at the last corner and was airlifted to hospital with a leg injury. As he was not fit to race, Jarno Trulli was the only driver representing Toyota. On 11 October 2009, Toyota confirmed that its test driver Kamui Kobayashi would make his race debut in the Brazilian Grand Prix, as Glock had suffered further complications from his accident, resulting in a cracked vertebra and he would not be guaranteed to be fit in time to race in Brazil and Abu Dhabi. Toyota pulled out of F1 at the end of 2009, leaving an uncertain future for Glock.

Virgin (2010–2011)

Glock's future for a time appeared uncertain, but on 17 November new team Manor Grand Prix announced that he had signed for them and would be their lead driver for the 2010 and 2011 seasons. It seemed as though Glock would partner Polish driver Robert Kubica at Renault, but following Renault's decision to announce whether it will take part in Formula 1 for 2010, Glock chose an option where he will be guaranteed a drive although the car might be less competitive. Manor became Virgin Racing in November 2009 and that Glock's former GP2 rival Lucas di Grassi would become his teammate. Glock started the 2010 season with three successive retirements in Bahrain, Australia and Malaysia. In addition, he failed to start the Chinese Grand Prix due to engine failure; This was despite good qualifying performances which saw him out-qualify all of the new teams' drivers in Bahrain and regularly start higher than his teammate Di Grassi. The Spanish Grand Prix was where he recorded his first finish for the team, and his first finish of the season with 18th place. Glock's best result of the season saw him finish in 14th in Japan, the team's best result of the year.

On 24 July 2011, it was announced that Glock had signed a 3-year extension to his current contract, committing him to Virgin until 2014.

Marussia (2012)

The team was renamed as Marussia F1 for the 2012 season and he would partner his third teammate in his three years at the team, French rookie Charles Pic. Marussia were forced to pull out of pre-season testing after failing a crash test for rear impact but eventually they passed allowing Glock to compete in the opening race. Glock started the 2012 season strongly by finishing 14th in Australia which equaled his highest ever finish with the Virgin/Marussia team. Glock came 17th in Malaysia, and then scored two consecutive 19th-place finishes in China and Bahrain.

Glock withdrew from the  after contracting a stomach bug. However, he was fit in time for the  where he finished 18th, and he followed that up with 22nd at his home Grand Prix. It was reported at the Hungarian Grand Prix that a feud was brewing between Glock and his teammate after Pic blocked him during qualifying. Glock finished the race 21st after battling with Michael Schumacher and Pedro de la Rosa. Glock finished 15th at Spa after a collision with Pastor Maldonado. He suffered no damage and finished ahead of his teammate as they battled in the final stages of the race while also getting lapped by other cars. At Monza, he finished 17th after sustaining front wing damage after colliding with Vitaly Petrov in the second corner of lap 1.

However at Singapore, he produced his best result for Marussia, finishing in 12th place after a faultless performance. This crucially pushed Marussia into 10th place in the Constructors' Championship, due to a better non-points finishing record. In Japan Glock was up to 11th by the second lap after two first corner incidents, however he finished 16th. In Korea he finished 18th, and in India he came 20th after another battle with Michael Schumacher. He encountered Schumacher again in Abu Dhabi and let him pass to overtake Heikki Kovalainen who was in the crucial 12th place needed to demote Marussia to 11th in the Constructors' Championship. In São Paulo, he was running strongly and ahead of the Caterhams until he was hit by Jean-Éric Vergne. He claimed this 'destroyed his race' with Petrov ultimately passing Charles Pic to take 10th spot for Caterham in the championship. Glock finished the season 20th in the Drivers' Championship; his best yet for the Virgin/Marussia team.

For the 2013 season he was due to remain with Marussia and partner Max Chilton who would have been his fourth teammate in four years at the team, however on 21 January 2013 it was confirmed that Glock had left Marussia by mutual consent.

DTM (2013–present)

Glock switched to the DTM in 2013, signing for BMW. In his third race he scored his first points and podium with third place. He would not score any more points until the final race of the season at Hockenheim, where he won his first DTM race of his career.

Personal life
Glock lives in Switzerland with his wife, German model Isabell Reis. She travels the world with him during the season. Glock and Reis are neighbours and close friends with former Caterham F1 driver Heikki Kovalainen and his British wife Catherine Hyde.

Racing record

Career summary

 As Glock was a guest driver he was ineligible to score points.
* Season still in progress.

Complete Formula Three Euro Series results
(key) (Races in bold indicate pole position) (Races in italics indicate fastest lap)

Complete Porsche Supercup results
(key) (Races in bold indicate pole position) (Races in italics indicate fastest lap)

‡ Not eligible for points.

Complete Formula One results
(key) (Races in bold indicate pole position) (Races in italics indicate fastest lap)

 Half points were awarded at the 2009 Malaysian Grand Prix as less than 75% of the race distance was completed.

Complete Champ Car Series results
(key) (Races in bold indicate pole position) (Races in italics indicate fastest lap)

Complete GP2 Series results
(key) (Races in bold indicate pole position) (Races in italics indicate fastest lap)

Complete Deutsche Tourenwagen Masters results
(key) (Races in bold indicate pole position) (Races in italics indicate fastest lap)

† Driver retired, but was classified as they completed 75% of the winner's race distance.
‡ Driver was a guest driver ineligible for points.

Complete Bathurst 12 Hour results

Complete WeatherTech SportsCar Championship results
(key) (Races in bold indicate pole position; races in italics indicate fastest lap)

Stock Car Brasil results

† Did not finish the race, but was classified as he completed over 90% of the race distance.

References

Sources
 Formula One World Championship results are derived from

External links

 

German racing drivers
German Formula One drivers
Jordan Formula One drivers
Toyota Formula One drivers
Virgin Racing Formula One drivers
Marussia Formula One drivers
People from Bergstraße (district)
Sportspeople from Darmstadt (region)
Racing drivers from Hesse
1982 births
Living people
Champ Car drivers
GP2 Series drivers
GP2 Series Champions
Formula 3 Euro Series drivers
German Formula Three Championship drivers
Formula BMW ADAC drivers
Porsche Supercup drivers
Deutsche Tourenwagen Masters drivers
Blancpain Endurance Series drivers
24 Hours of Daytona drivers
24 Hours of Spa drivers
WeatherTech SportsCar Championship drivers
Manor Motorsport drivers
Stock Car Brasil drivers
ISport International drivers
Rowe Racing drivers
Racing Bart Mampaey drivers
Rahal Letterman Lanigan Racing drivers
BMW M drivers
Rocketsports Racing drivers
German expatriate sportspeople in Switzerland